Gines Francisco Soriano (July 6, 1928 – February 21, 2004), also known as Nestor de Villa, was a Filipino actor frequently cast in musical films. He was a gifted dancer, often paired with frequent on-screen partner Nida Blanca in both movies and television. His dancing talent led some people to call him the "Fred Astaire of the Philippines", though the same moniker had also been given to Bayani Casimiro.

Early life and later career
De Villa was born Gines Francisco Soriano on July 6, 1928 in then municipality of Cabanatuan in the province of Nueva Ecija. He was a pre-medical student when he was signed by LVN Pictures. His father was disappointed by his decision to become an actor, and the two became estranged. However, they were reconciled by LVN President Doña Sisang de Leon, who arranged to have de Villa's father secretly attend one of his movie premieres.

He made his first movie with LVN, Amor-Mio (My Love), in 1951. The following year, he teamed up with another LVN contract star, Nida Blanca, for Romansa sa Nayon. The film's success popularized the Nestor-Nida "love team", though in real-life, de Villa would marry Marilu Cacho Soriano from the wealthy and socially prominent Cacho family.

He remained at LVN until 1961, when the studio discontinued making films. He then transferred to Sampaguita Pictures where in 1962 he made his Sampaguita debut in Tugtuging Bukid (Farm Music), together with Gloria Romero. In the 1960s, he was nominated three times for the FAMAS Best Actor award—for Mga Yapak ng Walang Bakas (1962); Naku Yabang (1964); and Siete Dolores (1968).  De Villa and Blanca also appeared together on an ABS-CBN television show, The Nida-Nestor Show.

In the 1980s, de Villa made his screen comeback when he was again paired with Blanca in two movies for Viva Films: Forgive and Forget, which also starred Sharon Cuneta and William Martinez and Saan Darating Ang Umaga? (Where Will the Morning Come), a family drama co-starring Maricel Soriano, Nida Blanca and Jaypee de Guzman.

He was posthumously inducted to the Philippines Eastwood City Walk Of Fame in December 2005.

Personal life
He was married to Marilu Cacho, has three sons and daughters-in-law, Jeric and Marissa, Gicky and Malu, Joby and Cindy. His only daughter Karel is married to Toti Belda. His grandson Paul Soriano is a son of Jeric, and is also a TV and commercial director.

Filmography

Movies

TV shows

Death
De Villa remained active in films until his death of complications arising from hepatobiliary cancer on February 21, 2004.

Notes

External links

1928 births
2004 deaths
Filipino Christians
Filipino evangelicals
Filipino Pentecostals
Filipino Protestants
Filipino television personalities
Filipino dance musicians
Filipino male dancers
People from Cabanatuan
Male actors from Nueva Ecija
Deaths from prostate cancer
Deaths from cancer in the Philippines